Panruti block is a revenue block of Cuddalore district of the Indian state of Tamil Nadu. This revenue block consist of 42 panchayat villages.

List of Panchayat Villages

References 

Revenue blocks of Cuddalore district